A barrier certificate or barrier function is used to prove that a given region is forward invariant for a given ordinary differential equation or hybrid dynamical system. That is, a barrier function can be used to show that if a solution starts in a given set, then it cannot leave that set.

Showing that a set is forward invariant is an aspect of safety, which is the property where a system is guaranteed to avoid obstacles specified as an unsafe set. 

Barrier certificates play the analogical role for safety to the role of Lyapunov functions for stability. For every ordinary differential equation that robustly fulfills a safety property of a certain type there is a corresponding barrier certificate.

History  
The first result in the field of barrier certificates was the Nagumo theorem by  Mitio Nagumo in 1942. The term "barrier certificate" was introduced later based on similar concept in convex optimization called barrier functions.

Barrier certificates were generalized to hybrid systems in 2004 by Stephen Prajna and Ali Jadbabaie.

Variants  
There are several different types of barrier functions. One distinguishing factor is the behavior of the barrier function at the boundary of the forward invariant set . Here, "reciprocal" refers to the fact that a reciprocal barrier functions can be defined as the multiplicative inverse of a zeroing barrier function

References 

Differential equations